Princess Maria Immaculata Cristina Pia Isabella of Bourbon-Two Sicilies (Full Italian name: Maria Immacolata Speranza Pia Teresa Cristina Filomena Lucia Anna Isabella Cecilia Apollonia Barbara Agnese Zenobia, Principessa di Borbone delle Due Sicilie,) (30 October 1874 – 28 November 1947) was the fourth child and eldest daughter of Prince Alfonso of Bourbon-Two Sicilies, Count of Caserta and his wife Princess Maria Antonietta of Bourbon-Two Sicilies.

Marriage

Maria Immaculata married Prince Johann Georg of Saxony, sixth child and second-eldest son of George of Saxony and his wife Maria Anna of Portugal, on 30 October 1906 in Cannes. Her mother-in-law, Maria Anna, was the daughter of Maria II of Portugal and her husband Ferdinand II of Portugal. The couple did not have children.

Ancestry

References

1874 births
1947 deaths
People from Cannes
House of Wettin
Saxon princesses
Princesses of Bourbon-Two Sicilies
Burials at Dresden Cathedral
French Roman Catholics